The 2013–14 SMU Mustangs men's basketball team represented Southern Methodist University (SMU) during the 2013–14 NCAA Division I men's basketball season. The Mustangs played home games on their campus in University Park, Texas at Moody Coliseum. The 2013–14 season was the first season the Mustangs participated in the American Athletic Conference. They finished the season 27–10, 12–6 in AAC play to finish in a three-way tie for third place. They lost in the quarterfinals of the AAC tournament to Houston. They were invited to the National Invitation Tournament where they defeated UC Irvine, LSU, California and Clemson to advance to the NIT championship game where they lost to Minnesota. The 2013–14 season marked the first time in 30 years the SMU Mustangs had been ranked in the AP Poll.

Off-season

2013–2014 Season Highlight: https://www.youtube.com/watch?v=XLou7XIYqr4

Departures

2013 recruiting class

Roster

Schedule and results

|-
!colspan=9 style="background:#B10000; color:#032B66;"| Regular season

|-
!colspan=9 style="background:#B10000; color:#032B66;"| American Athletic Conference tournament

|-
!colspan=9 style="background:#B10000; color:#032B66;"| NIT

Rankings

References

SMU Mustangs men's basketball seasons
Smu
SMU